Selwyn is a rural town and locality in the Shire of Cloncurry, Queensland, Australia. Selwyn is now an abandoned mining town. In the  the locality of Selwyn had a population of 50 people.

History 

Selwyn takes its name from the Selwyn Range, which was named in turn after Alfred Richard Cecil Selwyn, a geologist who was Director of the Geological Survey of Victoria from 1852 to 1869. It was formerly known as Mount Elliott after the prospector James Elliott who discovered copper and gold in the area in 1889.

Mount Elliott Provisional School opened on 1908. On 1 January 1909 it became Mount Elliott State School. In 1912 it was renamed Selwyn State School. It closed circa 1936.

On 15 December 1910 the Selwyn railway line opened to service the Hampden and Mount Elliott mines. It was a branch of the Great Northern Railway and ran south from Cloncurry to Selwyn.

Selwyn's population peaked in 1918 with an estimated population of 1500 people with a hospital and four hotels. However, in 1920, copper prices collapsed and by 1921 only 191 people were still living in Selwyn.

Mount Cobalt Provisional School opened on 1924 and closed on 1926.

The railway line to Selwyn was closed in 1961.

In the  the locality of Selwyn had a population of 50 people.

Heritage listings 
Selwyn has a number of heritage-listed sites, including:
 Mount Elliott Mining Complex

Present day
Although the town of Selwyn is now abandoned, the mining and processing of phosphate occurs in the south-west of the locality at Phosphate Hill. The facility employs about 250 people with annual capacity of 975,000 tonnes. The mine is serviced by the on-site Phosphate Hill Power Station. The mine is serviced by the Phosphate Hill railway station at the terminus of the Phosphate Hill railway line which branches from the Great Northern Line at the Flynn railway station.

References

External links 

 Town plan of Selwyn, 1979

Shire of Cloncurry
Mining towns in Queensland
Ghost towns in Queensland
Localities in Queensland